Strange Interlude is an experimental play in nine acts by  American playwright Eugene O'Neill. O'Neill began work on it as early as 1923 and developed its scenario in 1925; he wrote the play between May 1926 and the summer of 1927, and completed its text for publication in January 1928, during the final rehearsals for its premiere performance. Strange Interlude opened on Broadway on January 30, 1928, and won the Pulitzer Prize for Drama. Lynn Fontanne originated the central role of Nina Leeds on Broadway. It was also produced in London at the Lyric Theatre in 1931. It was included in Burns Mantle's The Best Plays of 1927-1928.  Because of its length, around five hours if uncut, the play has sometimes been produced with a dinner break or on consecutive evenings. The play's themes – a woman's sexual affairs, mental illness, abortion, and deception over paternity – were very controversial for the 1920s. It was censored or banned in many cities outside New York.

Strange Interlude makes extensive use of a soliloquy technique, in which the characters speak their inner thoughts to the audience.

Plot summary
The plot centers on Nina Leeds, the daughter of a classics professor at a college in New England, who is devastated when her adored fiancé is killed in World War I, before they have a chance to consummate their passion. Ignoring the unconditional love of the novelist Charles Marsden, Nina embarks on a series of sordid affairs before determining to marry an amiable fool, Sam Evans. While Nina is pregnant with Sam's child, she learns a horrifying secret known only to Sam's mother: insanity runs in the Evans family and could be inherited by any child of Sam's. Realizing that a child is essential to her own and to Sam's happiness, Nina decides on a "scientific" solution. She will abort Sam's child and conceive a child with the physician Ned Darrell, letting Sam believe that it is his. The plan backfires when Nina and Ned's intimacy leads to their falling passionately in love. Twenty years later, Sam and Nina's son Gordon Evans is approaching manhood, with only Nina and Ned aware of the boy's true parentage. In the final act, Sam dies of a stroke without learning the truth. This leaves Nina free to marry Ned Darrell, but she declines to do so, choosing instead to marry the long-suffering Charlie Marsden, who proclaims that he now has "all the luck at last."

The meaning of the title is suggested by the aging Nina in a speech near the end of the play: "Our lives are merely strange dark interludes in the electrical display of God the Father!"

Soliloquy technique
Many who have never read Strange Interlude or seen it performed will nevertheless associate the title with the unusual soliloquy technique employed by O’Neill to delve into his characters’ psychology.  Throughout the play, the characters alternate their spoken dialogue with monologues and side comments, many in stream-of-consciousness style, expressing their unspoken thoughts.

The play begins with a long soliloquy by the writer Charles Marsden (whom Nina Leeds patronizingly dubs “Dear Old Charlie”).  In this monologue, Marsden lays bare his ambiguous passion for Nina and his own conflicted attitude toward sex:

In Act Two, Marsden is introduced to Sam Evans, who will eventually marry Nina:

Later in Act Two, Dr. Ned Darrell, who is treating Nina for nervous disorders, arrives, and he and Marsden size each other up:

In Act Eight, set during a rowing competition twenty years later, Nina has difficulty coming to terms with the fact that her beloved son Gordon is now a grown man with a fiancée, Madeline:

(Quotes from the text of Strange Interlude at Project Gutenberg.)

Production
Produced by the Theatre Guild, Strange Interlude opened January 30, 1928, at the John Golden Theatre. The original production was directed by Philip Moeller with settings by Jo Mielziner. The nine-act melodrama ran five hours, beginning at 5:15 p.m., breaking for dinner at 7:40 p.m., and resuming at 9 p.m.

Cast
 Tom Powers as Charles Marsden
 Philip Leigh as Professor Leeds
 Lynn Fontanne as Nina Leeds
 Earle Larimore as Sam Evans
 Glenn Anders as Edmund Darrell
 Helen Westley as Mrs. Amos Evans
 Charles Walters as Gordon Evans, as a boy
 Ethel Westley as Madeline Arnold
 John J. Burns as Gordon Evans, as a man

Five members of the original cast – Powers, Helen Westley, Burns, Ethel Westley and Walters – were still with the play when the production reached its first anniversary, and they had not missed a single performance. Powers was compelled to leave the cast at the end of March 1929 due to exhaustion. The original Broadway production ran 17 months.

Recent revivals of Strange Interlude have mostly edited the text to allow a three to 3.5 hour running time that can be accommodated in a normal, if lengthy, evening performance.  Notable recent productions include the 1985 London and Broadway revival starring Glenda Jackson (also adapted for television - see below), a 2012 production at the Shakespeare Theatre Company in Washington, D.C., and a 2013 production at the National Theatre London, starring Anne-Marie Duff. In 2017 actor David Greenspan revived the play as a six-hour solo show at the Irondale Theater Center in Brooklyn, New York (state).

Adaptations
Strange Interlude was adapted by Hollywood only once, in 1932. The MGM film, which starred Norma Shearer as Nina Leeds and Clark Gable as Dr. Ned Darrell, was a shortened and toned-down version of the play. Voiceovers were used for the soliloquies.

A 1963 Actors Studio production directed by Jose Quintero was issued by Columbia Masterworks Records in 1964. The company included Betty Field, Jane Fonda, Ben Gazzara, Pat Hingle, Geoffrey Horne, Geraldine Page, William Prince, Franchot Tone, and Richard Thomas. The album set was five LPs and was nominated for a Grammy in the category Best Documentary, Spoken Word Or Drama Recording (other Than Comedy).

A 1988 television version directed by Herbert Wise was based on a 1985 London stage revival and starred Edward Petherbridge as Charles, Glenda Jackson as Nina, and David Dukes as Ned (with Kenneth Branagh in the small part of Gordon Evans). This version follows O'Neill's original text fairly closely (except that it eliminates most of Act 7, a scene set when Gordon Evans is 11 years old), and allows the actors to speak their soliloquies naturally in the manner of the stage production.  It was broadcast in the U.S. as part of the PBS series American Playhouse.

Cultural references
Groucho Marx parodies this play in the 1930 Marx Brothers film, Animal Crackers. On the first of three "interludes", he says, "Pardon me while I have a strange interlude", whereupon he walks over to the camera and makes ersatz philosophical comments to himself and the audience.
The 1932 film Me and My Gal parodies the film version of the play released the same year, which used voiceovers instead of soliloquies. Spencer Tracy and Joan Bennett talk about having seen "Strange Innertubes", then have a romantic talk that parodies the technique.
MAD Magazine satirically combined the play with the television show Hazel in a piece that ran in the 1960s ("A Strange Interlude With Hazey").
The fledgling Howard Johnson's restaurant chain received a boost in 1929 when the mayor of Boston, Malcolm Nichols, banned a production of Strange Interlude from his city. The Theatre Guild moved the production to suburban Quincy, where it was presented with a dinner break. The original Howard Johnson's restaurant was near the theater, and hundreds of influential Bostonians discovered the restaurant, eventually leading to nationwide publicity for the chain.
 In the 1974 film We All Loved Each Other So Much, Antonio and Luciana attend this play; then Ettore Scola uses the soliloquy technique several times in that film.
 Charlotte Greenwood, in the 1942 film Springtime in the Rockies, begins her solo dance routine and soliloquy with "strange interlude".

References

External links
 
 1946 Theatre Guild on the Air radio adaptation of play – Part 2 at Internet Archive

1928 plays
Broadway plays
American plays adapted into films
Plays by Eugene O'Neill
Pulitzer Prize for Drama-winning works
Adultery in plays